Zoë Records is an independent record label that is a part of the Rounder Records group. Zoë predominantly distributes albums by folk rock and alternative pop artists. Artists who have released albums on the label include Mary Chapin Carpenter, Lisa Loeb, Grant Lee Phillips, Juliana Hatfield, Jules Shear, and The Nields. Preteen pop girl group Girl Authority also recorded for the label.

Distribution
Zoë is also the American distributor for releases by a number of Canadian artists who have separate deals with major or independent labels in Canada, such as Jann Arden, Cowboy Junkies, Sarah Harmer, Kathleen Edwards, Great Big Sea, Rush, the Cash Brothers, and the Tragically Hip. The record label is named after Zoë Virant, the daughter of CEO John Virant and former member of pop group Girl Authority.

Roster

Mary Chapin Carpenter
Merrie Amsterburg
The Harris
Felix Brothers
Jann Arden
The Bacon Brothers
Blake Babies
BoDeans
Dean & Britta
Tracy Bonham
Cash Brothers
Cowboy Junkies
The Damnwells
Gord Downie
Minnie Driver
Chris Duarte Group
Juliana Hatfield
Nicolai Dunger
Kathleen Edwards
Euphoria (Canadian band)
Girl Authority
Great Big Sea
Kay Hanley
Sarah Harmer
The Kennedys
King Wilkie
The Knitters
John Linnell
Lisa Loeb
Laura Love
Nerissa & Katryna Nields
The Nields
Dolores O'Riordan
Steven Page
Grant-Lee Phillips
Marky Ramone and the Intruders
Rush
Jules Shear
Duncan Sheik
Shivaree
Tangle Eye
Vienna Teng
They Might Be Giants
The Tragically Hip
Martha Wainwright
King Wilkie
Philip "Money" Owusu
 Lazzy jazz

Discography

See also 
 List of record labels

References

External links 
Official Website

 
American independent record labels
Folk record labels
Pop record labels
Alternative rock record labels